Phan is a district (amphoe) in the southern part of Chiang Rai province, northern Thailand.

Geography
Neighboring districts are (from the south west clockwise): Wiang Pa Pao, Mae Suai, Mae Lao, Mueang Chiang Rai, and Pa Daet of Chiang Rai Province; Mae Chai of Phayao province; and Wang Nuea of Lampang province.

The mountains of the Phi Pan Nam Range dominate the landscape of the district.

History
Originally named Mueang Phan, it was renamed Phan in 1938, as the word mueang was then reserved for the capital districts of the provinces.

Administration

Central administration 
The district Phan is subdivided into 15 subdistricts (Tambon), which are further subdivided into 236 administrative villages (Muban).

Local administration 
There are 2 subdistrict municipalities (Thesaban Tambon) in the district:
 Mueang Phan consisting of parts of the subdistrict Mueang Phan.
 San Makhet consisting of the complete subdistrict San Makhet.

There are 14 subdistrict administrative organizations (SAO) in the district:
 Mae O consisting of the complete subdistrict Mae O.
 Than Thong consisting of the complete subdistrict Than Thong.
 Santi Suk consisting of the complete subdistrict Santi Suk.
 Doi Ngam consisting of the complete subdistrict Doi Ngam.
 Hua Ngom consisting of the complete subdistrict Hua Ngom.
 Charoen Mueang consisting of the complete subdistrict Charoen Mueang.
 Pa Hung consisting of the complete subdistrict Pa Hung.
 Muang Kham consisting of the complete subdistrict Muang Kham.
 Sai Khao consisting of the complete subdistrict Sai Khao.
 San Klang consisting of the complete subdistrict San Klang.
 Mae Yen consisting of the complete subdistrict Mae Yen.
 Mueang Phan consisting of parts of the subdistrict Mueang Phan.
 Than Tawan consisting of the complete subdistrict Than Tawan.
 Wiang Hao consisting of the complete subdistrict Wiang Hao.

References

External links

amphoe.com (Thai)

Phan